The XSR 48 is a powerboat designed by companies XSMG Marine and Green Marine. The XSR 48 is built at the Berthon Shipyard in Lymington. The XSR 48 was announced in 2006, and was featured on Top Gear in a race between hosts Richard Hammond and James May, with May operating the XSR 48 from Portofino to Saint-Tropez.

The XSR 48 features two, 11.3 liter twin-turbo Diesel engines with a combined output of 1,600 HP, and a top speed of 75 knots.

The boat was designed by Fabio Buzzi and Redman Whiteley Dixon, and is built out of composite Kevlar and carbon fiber hull and deck. The boat measures 14 m (48 ft) in length and 3 m (9 ft) across its beam.

The boat is built-to-order only and costs US$2.05 million.

References

Motorboats